Arashi  was a  of the Imperial Japanese Navy.

Arashi played a vital role in World War II by inadvertently guiding US attack planes to the Japanese carrier fleet at the Battle of Midway. Arashi had become separated from the Japanese carrier force while attempting to destroy an American submarine, . Following her attacks on Nautilus, Arashi steamed at high speed to rejoin the group.

Design and description
The Kagerō class was an enlarged and improved version of the preceding . Their crew numbered 240 officers and enlisted men. The ships had two Kampon geared steam turbines, each driving one propeller shaft, using steam provided by three Kampon water-tube boilers.

The main armament of the Kagerō class consisted of six Type 3  guns in three twin-gun turrets, one superfiring pair aft and one turret forward of the superstructure. They were built with four Type 96  anti-aircraft guns in two twin-gun mounts, but more of these guns were added over the course of the war. The ships were also armed with eight  torpedo tubes for the oxygen-fueled Type 93 "Long Lance" torpedo in two quadruple traversing mounts; one reload was carried for each tube. Their anti-submarine weapons comprised 16 depth charges.

Construction and career

Early Operations
On 3 March 1942 Arashi assisted in sinking the gunboat .

Midway

Arashi is most famous for its involvement in the Battle of Midway. Providing escort to the carrier group, the destroyer was alerted to the presence of an approaching U.S. submarine, when a Japanese Zero fighter aircraft dived and fired machine guns at Nautilus as it came to periscope depth. Arashi spotted the encounter and began to drop depth charges. The Japanese Task force changed course while Arashi continued its attack on Nautilus.  Having kept Nautilus down long enough that she no longer was a threat, the captain of Arashi finally broke off the attack and steamed north to rejoin the carrier group.  As two squadrons of dive bombers from Enterprise searched above for the Japanese Task Force, Arashi was spotted making great speed to the north. The ship's speed created a long wake, which acted as a direction arrow to the American aviators, guiding them to the Japanese carriers.  Meanwhile, Japanese fighter aircraft protecting the carriers had been pulled away as they all attempted to engage an incoming torpedo attack from Hornets VT-8 torpedo squad.  At the moment of decision, the Japanese carriers were essentially without high air cover. This made for an uncontested approach for the American dive bombers.  The Enterprise dive bombers happened to arrive over the Japanese carriers  and  unimpeded, scoring multiple hits on Kaga and a single hit on Akagi that doomed both ships.

During the battle Arashi’s crew picked up, and subsequently murdered, one of the downed airman from Yorktown. He had been made to provide the Japanese with a general description of the make-up of the force they had been fighting against, the only clear description of the American carrier forces the Japanese obtained during the battle.  According to Admiral Chūichi Nagumo's battle report, the airman died the day following his recovery and was buried at sea. Among other facts the Japanese learned, the report indicated the pilot had been from Chicago. This was in fact Ensign Wesley Osmus, one of the TBD pilots of VT-3. Osmus was flying the last plane in VT-3's formation, and thus was first to be attacked and destroyed as they made their approach. Osmus was picked up later on 4 June and buried 5 June.  A U.S. Naval investigation after the war interviewed witnesses who reported that after his interrogation Osmus had been taken to the stern of Arashi and struck in the back of the neck with a fire axe.  He clung briefly to the railing, and then was pushed overboard into the sea. An attempt was made to find the captain of Arashi (Commander Watanabe Yasumasa) and try him for war crimes, but it was discovered that he had died later in the conflict (he was Killed In Action as Commander Destroyer Division 1 aboard destroyer Numakaze on 18 December 1943), and the matter was set aside.

At the Solomon Islands
Arashi was part of a Japanese convoy that sailed through the Blackett Strait in 1943. The convoy's lead ship, Amagiri, is famous for being the vessel to ram and sink the American patrol craft PT-109, the PT boat commanded by Lieutenant John F. Kennedy, who would survive the war and go on to become the President of the United States.

On 7 August 1943, Arashi was again attempting to land reinforcements to the garrison on New Georgia island as part of a four-destroyer fast convoy when she was intercepted by a U.S. destroyer force lying in wait between Kolombangara and Vella Lavella. The U.S. forces struck with complete surprise.

Notes

References

External links
 CombinedFleet.com: Kagero-class destroyers
 CombinedFleet.com: Arashi history

Kagerō-class destroyers
World War II destroyers of Japan
Shipwrecks in the Solomon Sea
1940 ships
Maritime incidents in August 1943
Ships built by Maizuru Naval Arsenal
Ships of the Battle of Midway